Clear the Ring, French title Au revoir M. Grock, is a French comedy drama film from 1950, directed by Pierre Billon, written by Christian-Falaize, and starring Grock and Louis de Funès. The German title of the film is Grock: Der Mann der die Welt zum Lachen brachte or Manege frei.

Cast 
 Grock: Adrien Wettach, alias Grock
 Suzy Prim: Countess Barinoff
 Héléna Manson: aunt Pauline
 Alfonso Bovino: Italian child
 Charles Lemontier: Mr Durand
 Maurice Regamey: Bourquaint
 Nadine Rousseau: Miss Wettach
 Monique Marquenet: Adélaïde
 Made Siamé: a waitress
 Louis de Funès: a spectator

References

External links 
 
 Au revoir M. Grock (1950) at the Films de France

1950 films
1950 comedy-drama films
French comedy-drama films
West German films
1950s French-language films
French black-and-white films
Films directed by Pierre Billon
Circus films
1950s French films